Football Club Part Sazan Mashhad is an Iranian association football club based in Mashhad.

Football clubs in Iran

References